La Marseillaise (1869–70) was a French weekly newspaper created by Henri Rochefort. It was first published on 19 December 1869. The writing staff included Paschal Grousset, Arthur Arnould, Gustave Flourens, Jules Vallès and Victor Noir. The paper was headquartered in Paris.

References

 
 

1869 establishments in France
1870 disestablishments in France
Defunct newspapers published in France
Defunct weekly newspapers
Publications established in 1869
Publications disestablished in 1870
Weekly newspapers published in France
Newspapers published in Paris